is a railway station in the city of Kannami, Shizuoka Prefecture, Japan, operated by Central Japan Railway Company (JR Tōkai).

Lines
Kannami Station is served by the Tōkaidō Main Line, and is located  114.5 kilometers from the starting point of the line at Tokyo Station.

Station layout
The station has a single Island platform serving Track 1 and Track 2, which are on passing loops with outside tracks to permit the through transit of express trains. The platform is connected to the station building by a footbridge. The station building has automated ticket machines, TOICA automated turnstiles and a staffed ticket office.

Platforms

Station history
Kannami Station was opened on December 1, 1934 when the section of the Tōkaidō Main Line connecting Atami with Numazu via the Tanna Tunnel was completed. Regularly scheduled freight service was discontinued in 1971. TOICA automated gates were installed in 2008.

Station numbering was introduced to the section of the Tōkaidō Line operated JR Central in March 2018; Kannami Station was assigned station number CA01.

Passenger statistics
In fiscal 2017, the station was used by an average of 1856 passengers daily (boarding passengers only).

Surrounding area
Kannami City Hall

See also
 List of Railway Stations in Japan

References

Yoshikawa, Fumio. Tokaido-sen 130-nen no ayumi. Grand-Prix Publishing (2002) .

External links

  

Railway stations in Japan opened in 1934
Railway stations in Shizuoka Prefecture
Tōkaidō Main Line
Stations of Central Japan Railway Company
Kannami, Shizuoka